Margery Kathleen Maude (April 29, 1889 – August 7, 1979) was an English actress of stage, screen and television.

Early life
Margery Maude was born in Wimbledon, London, the elder daughter of the actors Cyril and Winifred (née Emery) Maude.

Career
Maude appeared on Broadway between 1913 and 1965. She received the following commendation for her performance in a production of Rip van Winkle, opposite her father in the title role in 1911. Her mother also had a role in the play.Miss Margery Maude played her part with peculiar sweetness. She is a charming little actress, dainty, earnest and unaffected. Miss Winifred Emery had only a small part, but a telling one. She gave a touching rendering of an old lady in whose soul the bitterness of time was powerless to destroy the sweetness, and many eyes were moist while she was on stage.

Personal life
She married Joseph Warren Burden on 23 July 1917 in New York City; the couple had three children: Joseph, Jr. (1918–1944), Winifred and Pamela.

Death
Margery Maude died on 7 August 1979, at her home near Cleveland, Ohio, aged 90.

Filmography

References

External links

 
 
 Margery Maude photo set at the New York Public Library (NYPL)

1889 births
1979 deaths
Actresses from London
English film actresses
English stage actresses
English television actresses
English expatriates in the United States
People from Wimbledon, London
20th-century English actresses